The Australian Office in Taipei represents Australian interests in Taiwan in the absence of formal diplomatic relations, functioning as a de facto embassy.  The Office is headed by a Representative.

Its counterpart in Australia is the Taipei Economic and Cultural Office in Australia in Canberra.

History
It was established in 1981 as the Australian Commerce and Industry Office. This was under control of the Australian Chamber of Commerce. It adopted its present name in 2012.

The Visa and Citizenship Office of the Australian Consulate-General in Hong Kong is responsible for consular matters for applicants in Taiwan.

Before 1972, Australia recognised Taiwan as the "Republic of China", and had an embassy in Taipei, opened in 1966. In 1972, diplomatic relations were ended following the decision of the government of 
Gough Whitlam to recognise the People's Republic of China.

An unofficial organisation known as the Australia-Free China Society, established an office in 1974 to provide services for Australians visiting Taiwan, headed by Lu Chen-kai, Secretary-General of the Sino-Australian Cultural and Economic Association in Taipei. In Australia, Douglas Darby, a member of the NSW Legislative Assembly, President of the Australia-Free China Society, represented Taiwan in Australia.

List of representatives

See also
 Australia–Taiwan relations

References

External links
 

Taipei
Representative Offices in Taipei
Australia–Taiwan relations
1981 establishments in Taiwan
Organizations established in 1981